Yekaterinovsky (masculine), Yekaterinovskaya (feminine), or Yekaterinovskoye (neuter) is the name of several rural localities in Russia:
Yekaterinovsky, Adygea, a khutor in Giaginsky District of the Republic of Adygea
Yekaterinovsky, Krasnodar Krai, a khutor in Fedorovsky Rural Okrug of Abinsky District of Krasnodar Krai
Yekaterinovsky, Saratov Oblast, a settlement in Kalininsky District of Saratov Oblast
Yekaterinovsky, Stavropol Krai, a khutor in Zavetnensky Selsoviet of Kochubeyevsky District of Stavropol Krai